Nya or NYA may refer to:

Arts and entertainment
 Nya (film), a 2017 Burmese film
 Nya, a fictional character from Ninjago (TV series)

Businesses and organisations
National Youth Administration, a 1930s New Deal program in the United States
National Youth Agency, an educational charity in England and Wales
National Youth Assembly, an annual Church of Scotland youth gathering
New York Airways, a helicopter service in the New York City area 1949-1979
New York and Atlantic Railway, a Long Island, New York, freight railway
North Yarmouth Academy, an independent school in Yarmouth, Maine, U.S.

Linguistics
Chewa language, ISO 939-2/3 language code nya
, nya, a letter in the Jawi alphabet
, nya (Javanese), a letter in the Javanese script
Ña (Indic), a letter in Indic writing systems
Ñ, a character in the Spanish alphabet
 "Nyā", a transliteration of the Japanese for "meow"

People
Nya Kirby (born 2000), an English footballer
Nya Quesada (1919–2013), an Argentine actress

See also

Nyah, a place in Australia
Nyah nyah nyah nyah nyah nyah, a common children's chant